Angela Tomasa Bofill (born May 2, 1954) is an American singer-songwriter of Cuban-Puerto Rican origins. A New York native, Bofill began her professional career in the mid-1970s. Bofill is most known for singles such as, "This Time I'll Be Sweeter", "Angel of the Night", and "I Try". Bofill's career spans over four decades.

Biography

Early life and education
Bofill was born on May 2, 1954, in the Brooklyn area of New York City to a Cuban father and a Puerto Rican mother. Raised in The Bronx, Bofill grew up listening to Latin music and was also inspired by African-American performers. During Bofill's childhood, her weekends were taken up studying classical music and singing in New York City's All City Chorus, which featured the best singers from all of the high schools in the five boroughs. For high school, Bofill attended Hunter College High School; graduating in 1972. Bofill later studied at the Manhattan School of Music, receiving a Bachelor of Music degree in 1976.

Career
Bofill began her professional career, singing during her teenage years. Bofill performed with Ricardo Marrero & the Group and Dance Theater of Harlem chorus before being introduced to Dave Grusin and Larry Rosen of the jazz label GRP Records by Dave Valentin, her friend and jazz flutist. Grusin and Rosen signed Bofill and produced her first album, Angie, in 1978. Angie was well received both critically and commercially and included the chart single "This Time I'll Be Sweeter" (co-written by Gwen Guthrie and Haras Fyre), and Bofill's sprawling jazz composition, "Under the Moon and Over the Sky". Less than a year later, a second album, Angel of the Night was released and outperformed its predecessor. The album included the chart singles "What I Wouldn't Do (For the Love of You)" and the up tempo title track, as well as the song "I Try", written by Bofill and covered by Will Downing in 1991. The reception of these albums positioned Bofill as one of the first Latina singers to find success in the R&B and jazz markets.

Bofill performed a sold-out concert at Avery Fisher Hall as part of the Newport Jazz Festival on June 20, 1980.  Her musical director was Onaje Allen Gumbs, keyboards, Sammy Figueroa, percussion, a 9-piece band and guests including Steve Khan, guitar, Eddie Daniels, tenor sax and flute, and a 24-voice choir.

Clive Davis, the head of Arista Records, showed interest in Bofill. Arista had a distribution deal with GRP. Bofill switched labels for her next album, Something About You (1981). Produced by Narada Michael Walden, the album was an attempt to move Bofill into mainstream R&B and pop music. It didn't perform as well as previous releases, despite the singles "Holdin' Out for Love" and the title track, which both reached the R&B Top 40. The following year, Bofill and Walden reunited for Too Tough. The title song reached No. 5 on the R&B chart and spent four weeks at No. 2 on the Dance chart. A follow-up single, "Tonight I Give In", reached the Top 20. Several months later, Bofill released her final collaboration with Walden, Teaser. The album failed to match the success of Too Tough but did produce one Top 20 R&B hit, "I'm On Your Side", which has been covered by several artists, most notably Jennifer Holliday, who had a Top 10 hit with it in 1991.

Bofill recorded two more albums for Arista with the help of The System and George Duke before leaving the label in the mid-1980s. Following the birth of her daughter, she moved to Capitol Records and the producer Norman Connors for Intuition (1988), which produced her last significant chart success, a cover of Gino Vannelli's "I Just Wanna Stop", which reached No. 11 on the R&B chart. She recorded three more albums over the next eight years and provided backing vocals on albums for Diana Ross and Kirk Whalum and for Connors's Eternity (2000). She performed live (with a sizable audience internationally, particularly in Asia) and appeared in the stage plays God Don't Like Ugly and What a Man Wants, What a Man Needs. She also toured the US and Europe in multi-artist jazz shows.

Bofill returned to the stage, at the suggestion of Engel, for "The Angela Bofill Experience" after losing her ability to sing after her second stroke in 2007. In the show, Bofill recounted her life and career and was joined by Maysa Leak, Phil Perry, and Melba Moore, who performed her biggest hits and signature songs. In 2012, Bofill was profiled and interviewed for the TVOne documentary series, Unsung.

Personal life
Bofill was married to a country music artist Rick Vincent from 1984 until 1994 and together they have a daughter, Shauna.

Health problems
Bofill suffered a stroke on January 10, 2006, and was paralyzed on her left side. She convalesced at Sutter Hospital in Santa Rosa, California, and was released from intensive care on January 15, requiring speech and physical therapy. She lacked health insurance, and a benefit concert was organized to pay her hospital bills.

The show was planned by Rich Engel, her manager, and the New York radio stations Kiss FM and WFAN-FM,. It took place on March 11, 2006, at the Bergen Performing Arts Center in Englewood, New Jersey. Similar events followed, and other aid was sought from the Rhythm and Blues Foundation. Her album Live from Manila (recorded in September 2004) was released during this time. Bofill suffered a second stroke in July 2007 which required therapy and left both her speech and mobility impaired.

Discography

Studio albums

Live albums

Compilation albums

Singles

Awards
American Music Awards: 1984 – Best R&B/Soul Female Artist (nominated)
Bay Area Music Awards (Bammies): 1984 Outstanding Black Contemporary Artist/Group

Television
 Soul Train Saturday May 28, 1983
 The Pat Sajak Show January 26, 1989

References

External links
Biography on Yahoo! Music
Angel Bofill on SoulMusic.com
Artist profile on GospelCity
Artist biography on High Stakes Entertainment
Watch: Unsung Full Exclusive Angela Bofill

1954 births
Living people
American women singer-songwriters
American contemporary R&B singers
American soul singers
American dance musicians
American contraltos
American musicians of Cuban descent
American musicians of Puerto Rican descent
Contraltos
GRP Records artists
21st-century American women singers
20th-century American women singers
Ballad musicians
People from East Harlem
20th-century American singers
People of Afro–Puerto Rican descent
People of Afro–Cuban descent
American people of Puerto Rican descent
African-American women musicians
Hispanic and Latino American women singers
20th-century African-American women singers
21st-century African-American women singers
Singer-songwriters from New York (state)